ATST may refer to:

Daniel K. Inouye Solar Telescope, formerly known as Advanced Technology Solar Telescope
All Terrain Scout Transport (AT-ST), 2-legged type Imperial Walker from the Star Wars fictional universe
Atari ST, personal home computer